Oldham's bow-fingered gecko (Cyrtodatylus oldhami) is a species of lizard in the family Gekkonidae. The species is native to Myanmar and Thailand.

Etymology
Both the specific name, oldhami, and the common name, Oldham's bow-fingered gecko, are in honor of English plant collector Richard Oldham (1837–1864).

Geographic range
C. oldhami is found in southern Myanmar and southern Thailand.

Habitat

Description

Reproduction
C. oldhami is oviparous.

References

Further reading
Rösler, Herbert; Glaw, Frank (2008). "A new species of Cyrtodactylus Gray, 1827 (Squamata: Gekkonidae) from Malaysia including a literature survey of mensural and meristic data in the genus". Zootaxa 1729: 8-22.
Smith, Malcolm A. (1935). The Fauna of British India, Including Ceylon and Burma. Reptilia and Amphibia. Vol. II.—Sauria. London: Secretary of State for India in Council. (Taylor and Francis, printers). xiii + 440 pp. + Plate I + 2 maps. (Gymnodactylus oldhami, p. 50 + Plate I, figure C).
Taylor, Edward H. (1963). "The Lizards of Thailand". University of Kansas Science Bulletin 44 (14): 687–1077. (Cyrtodactylus oldhami, new combination, pp. 725–728, Figure 6).
Theobald, William (1876). Descriptive Catalogue of the Reptiles of British India. Calcutta: Thacker, Spink and Co. x + 238 + xxxviii + xii + four unnumbered plates + Plates I-II. (Gymnodactylus oldhami, new species, pp. 81–82).

Reptiles of Myanmar
Geckos of Thailand
Cyrtodactylus
Reptiles described in 1876
Taxa named by William Theobald